Patrick Francis Baxter (1 October 1891 – 3 April 1959) was an Irish politician from County Cavan. He was a Teachta Dála (TD) in the 1920s, and later a Senator for over 25 years, serving as Cathaoirleach of Seanad Éireann from 1954 to 1957.

Baxter was first elected to Dáil Éireann at the 1923 general election, when he won a seat as Farmers' Party TD for Cavan in the 4th Dáil. He had stood unsuccessfully in the 1922 general election, but after topping the poll in 1923 he was re-elected at the June 1927 general election with his vote halved. He lost his seat at the September 1927 general election.

After the collapse of the Farmers' Party in the late 1920s, he made three further unsuccessful attempts to return to the Dáil: at the 1932 general election as a Cumann na nGaedheal candidate in Cavan, at the 1933 general election as a National Centre Party candidate in Clare, and as a Fine Gael candidate in Cavan at the 1943 general election.

He was elected in 1934 as a senator for Fine Gael, for a nine-year term, but the Free State Seanad was abolished in 1936. When the house was re-established, he was re-elected in 1938 to the 2nd Seanad on the Agricultural Panel, and held the seat until his death in office in 1959. He was a Clann na Talmhan senator from 1938 onwards.

References

1891 births
1959 deaths
Farmers' Party (Ireland) TDs
Clann na Talmhan senators
Cumann na nGaedheal politicians
National Centre Party (Ireland) politicians
Fine Gael senators
Cathaoirligh of Seanad Éireann
Members of the 4th Dáil
Members of the 5th Dáil
Members of the 1934 Seanad
Members of the 2nd Seanad
Members of the 3rd Seanad
Members of the 4th Seanad
Members of the 5th Seanad
Members of the 6th Seanad
Members of the 7th Seanad
Members of the 8th Seanad
Members of the 9th Seanad
20th-century Irish farmers